Escrava Mãe (English: The Slave Mother) is a Brazilian telenovela produced by Casablanca for RecordTV. Created by Gustavo Reiz and directed by Ivan Zettel. It premiered on May 31, 2016 and ended on January 9, 2017, replaced by the rerun of A Escrava Isaura. It stars Fernando Pavão, Roberta Gualda, Léo Rosa, Milena Toscano, Lidi Lisboa and Thaís Fersoza.

The telenovela tells the story of Juliana, the daughter of a slave brought from Africa and raped by a slave trader, who ends up in the Engenho do Sol after the death of her mother and lives under the love and hatred of the Avelar sisters. Pedro Carvalho plays the Portuguese Miguel, who comes to Brazil to seek answers about the mysterious death of his parents and falls in love with Juliana, having to overcome her fear of white men.

The plot won the Seoul International Drama Awards in the Serial-Drama Category.

Plot 
The story begins in 1788 in Congo, Africa. A tribe of Khoisans is invaded by white men, who imprison the natives and take them to Brazil on a slave ship, where they will be sold as slaves. During the trip, Luena is raped by the trafficker Osório, giving birth to Juliana and dying after childbirth. Juliana ends up in Engenho do Sol, in the village of São Salvador, where she is raised by Tia Joaquina and becomes a maid of the Avelar family, being protected by them, which generates the hatred of Esmeria, slave who never received the same privileges. After 20 years, Juliana's relationship with the two heiresses of the sugar mill is completely different: while she is taken as a friend and confidant by Teresa, her younger daughter is also treated with contempt by Maria Isabel, the merciless eldest daughter. The life of Juliana changes with the arrival of Miguel, a Portuguese who is in search of clues on the mysterious death of its father and ends up living a love forbidden with her. The terrible Osorio is also in the village, working as a factor at a nearby farm, and is not only linked to the pains of Juliana's life, although she does not know, as well as Miguel, since he was involved in the murder of the boy's father.

Cast 
 Gabriela Moreyra as Juliana dos Anjos
 Pedro Carvalho as Miguel Sales
 Thaís Fersoza as Maria Isabel de Avelar
 Zezé Motta as Tia Joaquina
 Fernando Pavão as Fernando Almeida 'Comendador Almeida'
 Roberta Gualda as Teresa de Avelar Almeida
 Léo Rosa as Átila Duarte
 Milena Toscano as Filipa Gomes do Amaral / Joana Gomes do Amaral (young)
 Lidi Lisboa as Esméria / Malica Darrila
 Roger Gobeth as Guilherme Gomes do Amaral
 Luiz Guilherme as Coronel Quintiliano Gomes do Amaral
 Bete Coelho as Beatrice de Avelar
 Luíza Tomé as Rosalinda Pavão
 Adriana Lessa as Condessa Catarina Gama de Luccock / Jamala Darrila
 Jussara Freire as Urraca de Góis Almeida 'Baronesa de Barangalha'
 Jayme Periard as Osório
 Robertha Portella as Petúnia
 Karen Marinho as Beleza Soares 'Belezinha'
 Raphael Montagner as Tomás Gomes do Amaral
 Saulo Meneghetti as Charles de Alencastro
 Cássio Scapin as Antonio José de Alcântara as 'Tozé'
 Débora Gomez as Violeta Pavão
 Manuela Duarte as Dália Bem-Me-Quer
 César Pezzuoli as Nestor Soares
 Adriana Londoño as Irani Goitacá Soares
 Sidney Santiago as Sapião
 Junno Andrade as Capitão Loreto Veloso
 Mariza Marchetti as Rebeca Andrade Gama 'Lady Rebeca'
 Marcelo Batista as Kamau / Viriato
 Rogério Brito as Genésio
 Marcelo Escorel as Zé Leão
 Nill Marcondes as Tito Pardo
 Henri Pagnoncelli as Dr. Augusto Pacheco
 Elina de Souza as Bá Teixeira
 Graça Andrade as Gonzalina
 Júlio Levy as Soldado Crisaldo
 Ronaldo Reis as Soldado Sereno
 Théo Salomão as Leôncio Almeida de Avelar
 Bianca Paiva as Jasmin Duarte / Dorinha
 Jean Dandrah as Frei Abilio
 Isabella Bittar as Camélia
 Priscila Vaz as Margarida
 Amanda Anequini as Tulipa
 Taisa Pelosi as Orquídea

Special participation 
 Nayara Justino as Luena
 Antônio Petrin as Coronel Custódio de Avelar
 Ivan de Almeida as Velho Tião
 Neuza Borges as Mãe Quitéria
 Patrícia Mayo as Elza de Avelar
 [Victor Wagner] as Barbudo
 Luciana Vendramini as Ximena Veloso
 Moara Semeghini as Joana Gomes do Amaral
 Lara Córdula as Cigana Selma
 Kaik Pereira as Sapião (young)
 Rachel Aguiar as Maria Isabel de Avelar (young)
 Gaby Benevides as Rosalinda Pavão (young)
 Joana Rodrigues as Beatrice de Avelar (young)
 Cristhian Fernandes as Quintiliano do Amaral (young)
 Kido Mathelart as Soldado Peixoto
 Taiguara Nazareth as Líder dos quilombolas
 Evelyn Montesano as Tirinda
 Ton Crivelaro as Capitão do Mato

Production 
Filming began on May 21, 2015. The telenoved used 4K resolution, a format superior to the traditional HD of 1080i, having a dimension of 3840 pixels, the same used by Hollywood films for definition in cinematographic screens, leaving the images with a cinematographic dress. It was the first Brazilian production among all the stations that used this technology. The episode had a budget of R$350,000.

Ratings

References

External links 
 

2016 telenovelas
Brazilian telenovelas
RecordTV telenovelas
2016 Brazilian television series debuts
2017 Brazilian television series endings
Portuguese-language telenovelas